The Orang Asli Museum is a museum in Gombak, Selangor, Malaysia that showcases the history and tradition of the indigenous Orang Asli people. It includes a library and a small theater hall, and was opened on 29 September 1987 by Prime Minister Mahathir Mohamad.

See also
 List of museums in Malaysia

References

External links

 
 All Malaysia.info | Muzium Orang Asli
  Orang Asli Temuan Web Site
  Orang Asli Alternative Medicine

Gombak District
Museums in Selangor
Ethnic museums
Orang Asli
1987 establishments in Malaysia